The kinetic isotope effect (KIE) of ribulose-1,5-bisphosphate carboxylase oxygenase (RuBisCO) is the isotopic fractionation associated solely with the step in the Calvin-Benson cycle where a molecule of carbon dioxide is attached to the 5-carbon sugar ribulose-1,5-bisphosphate (RuBP) to produce two 3-carbon sugars called 3-phosphoglycerate (3 PGA). This chemical reaction is catalyzed by the enzyme RuBisCO, and this enzyme-catalyzed reaction creates the primary kinetic isotope effect of photosynthesis. It is also largely responsible for the isotopic compositions of photosynthetic organisms and the heterotrophs that eat them. Understanding the intrinsic KIE of RuBisCO is of interest to earth scientists, botanists, and ecologists because this isotopic biosignature can be used to reconstruct the evolution of photosynthesis and the rise of oxygen in the geologic record, reconstruct past evolutionary relationships and environmental conditions, and infer plant relationships and productivity in modern environments.

Reaction details and energetics 

First, a  molecule (that is not the  molecule that is eventually fixed) attaches to the uncharged ε-amino group of lysine 201 in the active site to form a carbamate. This carbamate then binds to the magnesium ion (Mg2+) in RuBisCO's active site. A molecule of RuBP then binds to the Mg2+ ion. The bound RuBP then loses a proton to form a reactive, enodiolate species. The rate-limiting step of the Calvin-Benson cycle is the addition of CO2 to this 2,3-enediol form of RuBP. This is the stage where the intrinsic KIE of Rubisco occurs because a new C-C bond is formed. The newly formed 2-carboxy-3-keto-D-arabinitol 1,5-bisphophate molecule is then hydrated and cleaved to form two molecules of 3-phosphoglycerate (3 PGA). 3 PGA is then converted into hexoses to be used in the photosynthetic organism's central metabolism.

The isotopic substitutions that can occur in this reaction are for carbon, oxygen, and/or hydrogen, though currently only a significant isotope effect is seen for carbon isotope substitution. Isotopes are atoms that have the same number of protons but varying numbers of neutrons. "Lighter" isotopes (like the stable carbon-12 isotope) have a smaller overall mass, and "heavier" isotopes (like the stable carbon-13 isotope or radioactive carbon-14 isotope) have a larger overall mass. Stable isotope geochemistry is concerned with how varying chemical and physical processes preferentially enrich or deplete stable isotopes. Enzymes like RuBisCO cause isotopic fractionation because molecules containing lighter isotopes have higher zero-point energies (ZPE), the lowest possible quantum energy state for a given molecular arrangement. For this reaction, 13CO2 has a lower ZPE than 12CO2 and sits lower in the potential energy well of the reactants. When enzymes catalyze chemical reactions, the lighter isotope is preferentially selected because it has a lower activation energy and is thus more energetically favorable to overcome the high potential-energy transition state and proceed through the reaction. Here, 12CO2 has a lower activation energy so more 12CO2 than 13CO2 goes through the reaction, resulting in the product (3 PGA) being lighter.

Ecological trade-offs influence isotope effects 
The observed intrinsic KIEs of RuBisCO have been correlated with two aspects of its enzyme kinetics: 1) Its "specificity" for CO2 over O2, and 2) Its rate of carboxylation.

Specificity (SC/O) 
The reactive enodiolate species is also sensitive to oxygen (O2), which results in the dual carboxylase / oxygenase activity of RuBisCO. This reaction is considered wasteful as it produces products (3-phosphoglycerate and 2-phosphoglycolate) that must be catabolized through photorespiration. This process requires energy and is a missed-opportunity for CO2 fixation, which results in the net loss of carbon fixation efficiency for the organism. The dual carboxylase / oxygenase activity of RuBisCO is exacerbated by the fact that O2 and CO2 are small, relatively indistinguishable molecules that can bind only weakly, if at all, in Michaelis-Menten complexes. There are four forms of RuBisCO (Form I, II, III, and IV), with Form I being the most abundantly used form. Form I is used extensively by higher plants, eukaryotic algae, cyanobacteria, and Pseudomonadota (formerly proteobacteria). Form II is also used but much less widespread, and can be found in some species of Pseudomonadota and in dinoflagellates. RuBisCOs from different photosynthetic organisms display varying abilities to distinguish between CO2 and O2. This property can be quantified and is termed "specificity" (Sc/o). A higher value of Sc/o means that a RuBisCO's carboxylase activity is greater than its oxygenase activity.

Rate of carboxylation (VC) and Michaelis-Menten constant (KC)  

The rate of carboxylation (VC) is the rate that RuBisCO fixes CO2 to RuBP under substrate saturated conditions. A higher value of VC corresponds to a higher rate of carboxylation. This rate of carboxylation can also be represented through its Michaelis-Menten constant KC, with a higher value of KC corresponding to a higher rate of carboxylation. VC is represented by Vmax, and KC is represented as KM in the generalized Michaelis-Menten curve. Although the rate of carboxylation varies among RuBisCO types, RuBisCO on average fixes only three molecules of CO2 per second. This is remarkably slow compared to typical enzyme catalytic rates, which usually catalyze reactions at the rate of thousands of molecules per second.

Phylogenetic patterns 

It has been observed among natural RuBisCOs that an increased ability to distinguish between CO2 and O2 (larger values of Sc/o) corresponds with a decreased rate of carboxylation (lower values of VC and KC). The variation and trade-off between Sc/o and KC has been observed across all photosynthetic organisms, from photosynthetic bacteria and algae to higher plants. Organisms using RuBisCOs with high values of VC / KC, and low values of Sc/o have localized RuBisCO to areas within the cell with artificially high local CO2 concentrations. In cyanobacteria, concentrations of CO2 are increased using a carboxysome, an icosahedral protein compartment about 100 nm in diameter that selectively uptakes bicarbonate and converts it to CO2 in the presence of RuBisCO. Organisms without a CCM, like certain plants, instead utilize RuBisCOs with high values of Sc/o and low values of VC and KC. It has been theorized that groups with a CCM have been able to maximize KC at the expense of decreasing Sc/o, because artificially enhancing the concentration of CO2 would decrease the concentration of O2 and remove the need for high CO2 specificity. However, the opposite is true for organisms without a CCM, who must optimize Sc/o at the expense of KC because O2 is readily present in the atmosphere.

This trade-off between Sc/o and VC or KC observed in extant organisms suggest that RuBisCO has evolved through geologic time to be maximally optimized in its current, modern environment. RuBisCO evolved over 2.5 billion years ago when atmospheric CO2 concentrations were 300 to 600 times higher than present day concentrations, and oxygen concentrations were only 5-18% of present-day levels. Therefore, because CO2 was abundant and O2 rare, there was no need for the ancestral RuBisCO enzyme to have high specificity. This is supported by the biochemical characterization of an ancestral RuBisCO enzyme, which has intermediate values of VC and SC/O between the extreme end-members.

It has been theorized that this ecological trade-off is due to the form that 2-carboxy-3-keto-D-arabinitol 1,5-bisphophate in its transient transition state before cleaving into two 3PGA molecules. The more closely the Mg2+-bound CO2 moiety resembles the carboxylate group in 2-carboxy-3-keto-D-arabinitol 1,5-bisphophate, the greater the structural difference between the transition states of carboxylation and oxygenation. The larger structural difference allows RuBisCO to better distinguish between CO2 and O2, resulting in larger values of Sc/o. However, this increasing structural similarity between the transition state and the product state requires strong binding at the carboxyketone group, and this binding is so strong that the rate of cleavage into two product 3PGA molecules is slowed. Therefore, an increased specificity for CO2 over O2 necessitates a lower overall rate of carboxylation. This theory implies that there is a physical chemistry limitation at the heart of Rubisco's active site, and may preclude any efforts to engineer a simultaneously more selective and faster Rubisco.

Isotope effects 

Sc/o has been positively correlated with the magnitude of carbon isotope fractionation (represented by Δ13C), with larger values of Sc/o corresponding with a larger values of Δ13C. It has been theorized that because increasing Sc/o means the transition state is more like the product, the O2C---C-2 bond will be shorter, resulting in a higher overall potential energy & vibrational energy. This creates a higher energy transition state, which makes it even harder for 13CO2 (lower in the potential energy well than 12CO2) to overcome the required activation energy. The RuBisCOs used by varying photosynthetic organisms vary slightly in their enzyme structure, and this enzyme structure results in varying transition states. This diversity in enzyme structure is reflected in the resulting Δ13C values measured from different photosynthetic organisms. However, overlap exists between the Δ13C values of different groups because the carbon isotope values measured are generally of the entire organism, and not just its RuBisCO enzyme. Many other factors, including growth rate and the isotopic composition of the starting substrate, can affect the carbon isotope values of whole organism and cause the spread seen in C isotope measurements.

See also 

 Isotope geochemistry
 Fractionation of carbon isotopes in oxygenic photosynthesis
 Isotopes of carbon
 Isotopic signature

References 

Chemical kinetics
Photosynthesis
Isotope separation